Sallapam is a 1996 Malayalam-language film directed by Sundar Das and written by A. K. Lohithadas, starring Manoj K. Jayan,  Dileep and Manju Warrier. The music was composed by Johnson. The film was remade in Telugu as Egire Paavurama.

Synopsis
Radha comes from a poor family and dreams of becoming a great singer. She falls in love with Sasikumar, who calls himself Junior Yesudas. Sasikumar is also from a poor family. When Radha asks to marry Sasikumar, he says he is helpless as he has a lot of responsibilities and he does not have the money. Radha decides to commit suicide but is rescued by her cousin whom she understands was in love with her.

Cast
 Manoj K. Jayan as Divakaran
 Dileep as Sasikumar / Junior Yesudas 
 Manju Warrier as Radha(voice-over by Sreeja)
 Bindu Panicker as Padmini
 Kozhikode Sarada as Divakaran's Mom
 Mala Aravindan as Kunjookuttan Ashaari
 N. F. Varghese as Chandran Nair
 Valsala Menon as Leelavathi Thampuratti
 Abubakkar as Damodaran
 Kalabhavan Mani as Rajappan
 Jagannatha Varma as Prabhakara Varma
 Oduvil Unnikrishnan as Madhava Menon
 Salu Kuttanadu as Raghavan
 Mammukoya as Railway worker
 Kaithapram Damodaran Namboothiri as Singer at the temple
 Ottapalam Pappan
 Manju Sahteesh

Music
The songs were composed by Johnson, with lyrics by Kaithapram Damodaran Namboothiri.

Box office
The film became both a critical and commercial success.

References

External links
 

1990s Malayalam-language films
Indian romantic drama films
1996 romantic drama films
1996 films
Films scored by Johnson
Indian romantic musical films
Malayalam films remade in other languages
Films shot in Palakkad
Films with screenplays by A. K. Lohithadas
Films directed by Sundar Das
1990s romantic musical films